Clepsis listerana is a species of moth of the family Tortricidae. It is found in North America, where it has been recorded from southern Quebec south to Tennessee and North Carolina.

The wingspan is 11–12 mm. Adults have been recorded on wing from June to September.

Etymology
The species is named in honour of A.E. Lister who first collected the species.

References

Moths described in 1907
Clepsis